Huanghe Township (Mandarin: 黄河乡) is a township in Madoi County, Golog Tibetan Autonomous Prefecture, Qinghai, China. In 2010, Huanghe Township had a total population of 1,585: 809 males and 776 females: 432 aged under 14, 1,076 aged between 15 and 65 and 77 aged over 65.

References 

Township-level divisions of Qinghai
Golog Tibetan Autonomous Prefecture